Bifascioides yemenellus is a moth in the family Cosmopterigidae. It is found in Yemen and southern Iran.

References

Moths described in 1961
Chrysopeleiinae
Moths of Asia
Taxa named by Hans Georg Amsel